Chavela is an American documentary film, directed by Catherine Gund and Daresha Kyi and released in 2017. The film is a portrait of Mexican singer and actress Chavela Vargas.

The film premiered at the 67th Berlin International Film Festival on February 9, 2017, in the Panorama Dokumente program. It was picked up for international distribution by Latido Films.

The film was a GLAAD Media Award nominee for Outstanding Documentary at the 29th GLAAD Media Awards. The film was screened at the 2017 Inside Out Film and Video Festival, where it won the Audience Award for Best Documentary, and at the 2018 Queer North Film Festival, where it won the Audience Choice award for Best Women's Film. The film also won a Pink Dragon Audience Award for the best film at the 2017 Ljubljana LGBT Film Festival.

References

External links

2017 films
2017 documentary films
2017 LGBT-related films
Mexican documentary films
Mexican LGBT-related films
Documentary films about lesbians
Documentary films about women in music
Documentary films about singers
2010s Mexican films